Coalition Front of Freedom-Seeking Parties or United Front of Progressive Parties was a political alliance of left-wing parties in Iran from 1946 to 1948.

Having originally been founded by the communist Tudeh Party and the socialist Iran Party, they invited other parties to join them in their alleged struggle for "social progress and national independence". One of the main planks of the united front was to recognize Central Council of United Trade Unions as the sole legitimate organization of the working-class in Iran.

Member parties 
 Tudeh Party of Iran (founding member)
 Iran Party (joined in June 1946, left in January 1947) 
 Socialist Party (founding member)
 Jungle Party (joined on 29 October 1946)
 Democratic Party of Kurdistan (joined on 29 October 1946)
 Democratic Party of Azerbaijan (joined on 29 October 1946)

References

1946 establishments in Iran
1948 disestablishments in Iran
Defunct left-wing political party alliances
Defunct political party alliances in Iran
Defunct socialist parties in Iran
Political parties disestablished in 1948
Political parties established in 1946
Iran
Tudeh Party of Iran